Four Thousand Seven Hundred And Sixty-Six Seconds - A Short Cut To Teenage Fanclub is a greatest hits album by Scottish alternative rock band Teenage Fanclub, released on 27 January 2003. The title refers to the album's total length, just 34 seconds short of the maximum running time possible on a single CD: as a consequence the tracks "Star Sign" and "My Uptight Life" were edited from its original versions in order to fit on to the album. "Everything Flows" was remixed for this collection.

The album comprises fourteen singles, four album tracks, and three new songs written for the album. It reached #47 in the UK album charts.

Track listing

Personnel
Credits are adapted from the album liner notes.

See original albums for full credits.

Teenage Fanclub
Norman Blake – vocals, guitar (1-21)
Gerard Love – vocals, bass (1-21)
Raymond McGinley – vocals, guitar (1-21)
Finlay Macdonald – keyboards (3, 7, 10, 14, 19, 21)
Brendan O'Hare – drums (1, 4, 5, 9)
Paul Quinn – drums (2, 6-8, 11, 12, 15-17, 19-21)
Francis Macdonald – drums (3, 10, 14)
Technical
Teenage Fanclub – producer (1-21), remixing (4)
Don Fleming – producer (1, 5, 9)
Paul Chisholm – producer (1, 5, 9)
David Bianco – producer (2, 6, 8, 11, 12, 15-17, 20)
Andy Macpherson – producer (13, 18)
Nick Brine – producer (3, 10, 14), remixing (4)
Steve Rooke – mastering
Scott King – art direction, design
Donald Milne – cover concept, cover photography 
Norman Blake, Raymond McGinley, Sharon Fitzgerald – photography (booklet) 
Alan McGee, Chas Banks, Dave Barker, David Bianco, Don Fleming, Stephen Pastel, Peter Mason – liner notes
New tracks (tracks 3, 10, 14)
John McCusker – violin, viola 
Isobel Campbell – cello
Nick Brine – engineer  
Darren Simpson – assistant engineer (Parr Street) 
Mike Cave – assistant engineer (Parr Street) )
James Morgan – assistant engineer (Rockfield) 
Jason Harris – assistant engineer (Rockfield) 
Recorded at Parr Street Studios, Liverpool and Rockfield Studios, Rockfield, Wales. Mixed at Rockfield.

Charts

References

2003 compilation albums
Teenage Fanclub compilation albums
Albums produced by Don Fleming (musician)
Jetset Records albums